The seventh American Basketball Association All-Star Game was played January 30, 1974 at Norfolk Scope in Norfolk, Virginia before an audience at 10,624. Babe McCarthy of the Kentucky Colonels coached the East, while Joe Mullaney of the Utah Stars coached the West.

Rookie Swen Nater scored 29 points and grabbed 22 rebounds for the West team, but the East team won the game and Artis Gilmore of the Kentucky Colonels was named MVP.

Western Conference

Eastern Conference
 

Halftime — East, 62-55
Third Quarter — East, 99-83
Officials: John Vanak and Wally Rooney
Attendance: 10,624.

References

External links 
 ABA All Star Game at RemembertheABA.com

All-Star
ABA All-star game
ABA All-star game